The Sun Fast 3200 is a French sailboat that was designed by Daniel Andrieu as a racer-cruiser and first built in 2008.

The Sun Fast 3200 is part of the Sun Fast sailboat range and was named 2008 - European Yacht of the Year: L < 10m.

It was replaced in production by the Sun Fast 3300 in 2019.

Production
The design was built by Jeanneau in France, from 2008 to 2019, but it is now out of production.

The boat was originally conceived as a limited production design for the Transquadra, a single or double-handed transatlantic race for sailors over 40 years of age. Production was initially intended for 15 to 20 boats, but the design found commercial success and over 150 had been built by 2015. Matthew Sheahan described it in Yachting World, "although loosely termed a racer, the category didn't fully describe what the Jeanneau Sun Fast 3200 was about. It became the sailing equivalent of the motor industry’s crossover category, a term to describe the growing range of suburban 4x4s – a multi-purpose racer."

Design
The Sun Fast 3200 is a racing keelboat, built predominantly of polyester fiberglass, with wood trim. The hull is made from a vacuum-infused fiberglass-balsa sandwich, while the deck is a vacuum-infused PVC-fiberglass sandwich. It has a 19/20 fractional sloop rig, with a keel-stepped mast, two sets of swept spreaders and aluminum spars with discontinuous Dyform rigging. The hull has a plumb stem, a reverse transom, dual internally mounted spade-type rudders controlled by dual tillers and a fixed "L"-shaped fin keel with a weighted bulb. It displaces  and carries  of lead ballast.

The design has sleeping accommodation for six people, with two settee berths in the main cabin and an aft cabin with four single berths. The galley is located on the starboard side at the companionway ladder. The galley is "L"-shaped and is equipped with a two-burner stove, an ice box and a sink. A navigation station is opposite the galley, on the port side. The head is located in the bow and there is a sail storage compartment in the forepeak.

An updated R2 version of the boat introduced a redesigned cockpit, carbon fiber mast and a straight keel.

Operational history
The boat was at one time supported by a class club that organized racing events, the Sun Fast Association.

See also
List of sailing boat types

References

External links

Keelboats
2000s sailboat type designs
Sailing yachts
Sailboat type designs by Daniel Andrieu
Sailboat types built by Jeanneau